Margaret E. Dungan (c. 1884–1982) was one of the founders of the Women's International League for Peace and Freedom.

She was a suffragette, a vegetarian, and a war tax resister. She began refusing to pay war taxes in 1940, making her one of the earliest war tax resisters of the modern era.

She participated in the Women Strike for Peace protest against the nuclear arms race in 1961, and joined the 1965 "March on Washington for Peace in Viet Nam".

She periodically represented her Quaker meeting to testify at subcommittee hearings at the U.S. Congress on issues related to topics like military conscription.

She was the author of the booklet The prospect of overcoming world hunger (1968).

References 

American tax resisters